Richard Moser is a fictional character from the police drama television series Inspector Rex, which airs on ORF and Sat.1 in the Austria. The character was created by series' producer  and Peter Moser, and is portrayed by actor Tobias Moretti.The first "team leader", Richard "Richie" Moser is a hard-bitten cop who, as the first season begins, is going through a bitter divorce from his wife Gina, who takes all their furniture. Moser is also attempting to quit smoking, due to medical problems to do with his circulation. An ex-truck driver, Moser credits Max Koch with keeping him from a life of crime, at one point telling Koch that "I'd be on the wrong side of the law too, just like him", referring to a young pickpocket he has just chased through central Vienna.

Moser has befriended Rex after Rex's former police trainer, Michael, was shot and killed by an escaping suspect, and, in order to save the dog from being put down, has "adopted" him without ever completing any of the official paperwork. He famously declares at one point, "My taxes pay for this dog, so why can't I give him a better home?"

Being a bachelor, Moser flirts with many of the attractive women featured in the storylines. However, with the exception of a brief and work-interrupted relationship with his local vet (of which Rex thoroughly disapproves), he forms no permanent romantic attachment.

As Moser's personal life improves, his sense of humour returns. This is noticeable in the general lightening in the tone of the show from the initial episodes ("Diagnosis Murder" being a prime example) to ones with more light-hearted banter among the officers.

In the final scenes of the season 4 episode "Moser's Death", Moser is killed in the line of duty by an escaped 'border-line psychopath' played by famous German actor Ulrich Tukur  while Moser is rescuing his lover, Patricia Neuhold (a psychologist who has been helping with the case). The escapee commits suicide just after he kills Moser, and Rex shows almost-human emotion over Moser's body at the hospital.

Inspector Rex characters